Zepp New Taipei It is a music hall located in the area of Xinzhuang District, Section 4, New Taipei Boulevard, New Taipei on the island of Taiwan (Republic of China). The venue was inaugurated in 2020 and as its name indicates it belongs to the Zepp group that includes several concert halls in Japan and other Asian countries such as Malaysia.

The space has a maximum capacity that varies as it can accommodate 2245 people standing and 1025 seated.
Many local and foreign artists have performed there, and since the measures taken during the Covid 19 pandemic were relaxed, national and international shows of all kinds are again allowed.

The venue is of moderate size, large enough to accommodate thousands of fans. There are also a small number of seating areas on the second floor.To see the full show on stage, visitors can choose the second floor. When spectators want to get up close to the singers, they can use the second floor.

In the area there are many restaurants that include local and international cuisine. Can be reached by public transportation, such as the MRT airport line and bus.

In 2022, GMMTV announced that this space would be used for the first fan meeting of Thai actors Ohm Pawat ( ภวัต จิตต์สว่างดี) and Nanon Korapat (กรภัทร์ เกิดพันธุ์) in Taipei on December 18 of the same year.

See also 

 Zepp
 Taipei Music Center

References

External links 

 Zepp Official Web Site

Buildings and structures in New Taipei
Concert halls in Taiwan